Callindra nyctemerata is a moth of the family Erebidae. It was described by Frederic Moore in 1879. It is found in India, China (Sichuan, Yunnan, Hunan and Tibet).

Subspecies
Callindra nyctemerata nyctemerata
Callindra nyctemerata fangchenglaiae Dubatolov et Kishida, 2006

References

Callimorphina
Moths described in 1879